Beth Medrash Elyon is a four-year, not-for-profit yeshiva in Monsey, New York.

History
Though Beth Medrash Elyon closed in the 1970s due to disagreements among the leaders of the yeshiva, the yeshiva was subsequently reopened. It was headed by R' Don Ungarischer, who was Grozovsky's son-in-law. Ungarischer died on October 30, 2011. His son-in-law, R' Yisroel Mordechai Falk, currently serves as Rosh Yeshiva.

Its past Roshei Yeshiva have included Rabbis Reuven Grozovsky, and Gedalia Schorr. 

As of 2014, tuition was $7,800 per year, and room and board $2,800. The college used a semester calendar, and the student-to-faculty ratio was 8. Almost all students received some form of financial aid, and the average grant aid to undergrads was approximately $8,000.

Alumni
Among Beth Medrash Elyon's graduates are Rabbis Yisroel Belsky, J.D. Bleich, Yosef Goldman, Nosson Scherman, Moshe Leib Rabinovich (current Munkatcher Rebbe), and Brooklyn Law School Professor Aaron Twerski. Dovid Schustal studied there and his father Rabbi Simcha Schustal was the Rosh kollel.

References

Orthodox yeshivas in Monsey, New York